Mỹ An is a township and capital of Tháp Mười District, Đồng Tháp Province, Vietnam.

References

Populated places in Đồng Tháp province
District capitals in Vietnam
Townships in Vietnam